Phan Lương Cầm (born March 5, 1943) is a  Vietnamese scientist and academic notable in the fields of Electrochemistry and Corrosion, widow of former Prime Minister of Vietnam Võ Văn Kiệt.

Academic and scientific work 
Phan Lương Cầm was born in Hue City, Thừa Thiên-Huế Province, Vietnam. In 1965, Phan Lương Cầm worked as an associate professor at the Hanoi University of Technology, Vietnam. In 1968  Cầm arrived in the former Soviet Union and studied at the Moscow State University. She also used to be a pianist when she was younger (approximately at 7-10) There, she was awarded a Ph.D for her thesis in the fields of Electrochemistry and Corrosion. On her return to Vietnam in early 1973, she resumed her academic post at the Hanoi University of Technology.

Over four decades working in the fields of education and research, Prof. Dr. Phan Lương Cầm has helped train and advise many graduate, master’s and doctoral students, and led a large number of significant scientific works, including scientific research theses and programs at the national level, international cooperation research project such as VH-8 Project Corrosion  in cooperation with the Netherlands from 1980. She has published several books, many journal and conference papers and her works have been cited many times. She is also author of a number of patents, innovations and creative solutions.

Prof. Dr. Phan Lương Cầm was a founder and director of the Corrosion and Protection Research Center - Hanoi University of Technology - from 1996 to 2008, the year when she retired.

She was the first woman Professor at the Hanoi University of Technology, She was also one of the co-founders and president of the Vietnam Corrosion and Metal Protection Association (VICORRA) from 1996 to 2005, and now she is its honorary president. It was the first time a woman ever served as president of an association under the Vietnam Union of Science and Technology Associations (VUSTA).

She was president of the Asian Pacific Materials and Corrosion Association from 1999 to 2001; Chairwoman of the 11th Asian Pacific Corrosion Control Conference (APCCC-11) held in Ho Chi Minh City in 1999  and member of the International Advisory Board for many other Asian Pacific Corrosion Control Conferences.

Family 
She was married to Võ Văn Kiệt, Prime Minister of Vietnam.

Charity and social work 
Over the past 20 years, Prof. Dr. Phan Lương Cầm has been actively involved in charity and social work, especially in the field of education i.e. helping students who are too poor to attend college after being admitted to a college. Besides donating scholarships, she helps students facing life hardships through their college years.

Awards and honors 
Prof. Dr. Phan Luong Cam was presented with the 1995 Kovalevskaya Award, Labor Medal and various Certificates of Merits in recognition of her contributions to the cause of education, science and technology, women’s advancement and children’s protection.

Notes

Selected bibliography

External links 
     Corrosion and Protection Research Center- Hanoi University of Technology
    Hanoi University of Technology - Scientific and technological achievements
     Vietnam Union of Science and Technology Associations (VUSTA)
   Heritage of Vietnamese Scientists and Scholars

1943 births
Living people
Vietnamese scientists
People from Huế
Vietnamese expatriates in the Soviet Union
Moscow State University alumni
Spouses of Vietnamese leaders